Peschard is a surname. The root "pesch-" derives from the Latin "piscis," which itself comes from the Proto-Indo-European "peysḱ-" meaning fish. The name is concentrated most heavily in France, Mexico, and the United States.

Academics
Alejandro Peschard Fernández, Mexican archaeologist
Armand Peschard-Sverdrup, Mexican political scientist
Isabelle Peschard, American philosopher
Guillermo Peschard, Mexican academic
Jacqueline Peschard, Mexican sociologist
María José Pantoja Peschard, Mexican political scientist

Architects
Beatriz Peschard, Mexican architect
Eugenio Peschard, Mexican architect

Artists
Albert Peschard, French organist
Auguste Jacques Étienne Peschard, French tenor
Deepak Peschard, Indian-French author
Jean Peschard, French painter
Jérôme Peschard, French painter
Julien Peschard, French painter

Politicians
Jean-Jacques Peschard, French politician

Revolutionaries
Raymonde Peschard, Algerian freedom fighter

References